Oriental Hero is a ninja-themed side-scrolling beat-'em-up video game which was published in 1987 exclusively for the ZX Spectrum by the Firebird Software Silver Range label. The game was developed by Tron Software and is the sequel to their earlier multi-computing-platform effort, Ninja Master (1986).

Gameplay and plot

Oriental Hero centers on the ninja protagonist, who after achieving victory in the previous game Ninja Master travels on the road leading to the palace of Zerwin the Wizard, who the protagonist must eventually defeat in order to win the title of Supreme Oriental Combat Master.

The game comprises four levels, each a horizontally scrolling platform on which the player-ninja must fight several ground and flying enemies and projectiles before reaching the boss at the end of the level. The player-ninja can defend himself by jumping or ducking; his only fighting moves are punching, kicking, and flying-kicking. The projectiles appear rapidly and can kill the player with one hit but can themselves be killed with one hit. The ground enemies on the other hand take between one to three hits to kill. The bosses at the end of each level—the Terrible Indian Cobra, the Highly Technical Triple Armed War Unit, Ivan Dragovich the Russian Master, and Zerwin the Wizard—can be killed with three hits.

Development
Michel Nass and Tommy Gardh of Tron Software, a Swedish video game development company, began working on Oriental Hero in late 1986, shortly after the release of Ninja Master, its predecessor. Nass was responsible for coding the game while Gardh produced the graphics and sound.

Oriental Hero was published in July 1987 by Firebird Software on their Silver Range budget label. It was one of the last of the games on the Silver Range before parent company Telecomsoft spun off the management of that label into its own subsidiary, Silverbird, in late 1987. The game supports both Sinclair's and Kempston Micro Electronics's joystick as controllers, as well as keyboard control through the ZX Spectrum's built-in keyboard. Though the ZX Spectrum 128 was out by the time of Oriental Hero release, the game does not take advantage of that system's increased memory and supports the original 48-KB ZX Spectrum.

Reception

Like its predecessor, Oriental Hero received mixed, mostly negative, reviews. A writer for the Airdrie & Coatbridge Advertiser called it a guilty pleasure—"a budget game which I know I shouldn't have enjoyed, but I did"—that provided "a few hours worth of fun". The writer praised the pixel art of the character sprites and felt the fighting mechanics worked "reasonably well" but called the command of movement "somewhat limited, and the side-scrolling "leav[ing] a bit to be desired". Despite the game's steep difficulty curve, the writer called the challenge addictive—"a couple of hours whisked by before I knew it"—with the challenge waning after a short while. Tony Dillon of Sinclair User meanwhile gave it four stars out of ten, writing that the game "is all so fast ... winning starts becoming a matter of luck".

Your Sinclair Rick Robson deemed the game lacking imagination and found it had nothing to offer for advanced players of kung-fu games but praised the graphics and sound and surmised that it would do well in sales. Nick Roberts, Ben Stone, and Paul Sumner, in a collective review for Crash, gave the game an average score of 30%. Stone wrote: "Oriental Hero is so incredibly bad it's almost worth a look ... rubbish gameplay, poor graphics and no lasting appeal." Like Robson, Roberts praised the graphics and sound but called the gameplay frustrating to the point of tears: "Wherever, whatever you do, you get killed before realising it. The terribly hard gameplay is a real shame, because otherwise Oriental Hero would be very addictive as kick-'em-ups go." Sumner called the game "totally unplayable; the graphics are very badly animated, with uninvolving backgrounds. Firebird should know better". The Portuguese newspaper A Capital called Oriental Hero a game to avoid and a black mark on the generally well-regarded catalog of Firebird, the game as a whole "add[ing] nothing to what is already known" and appearing glitchy, especially in the "bad animation" of the sprites.

References

External links
 
 
 Terrible Old Games You've Probably Never Heard Of – Oriental Hero by Stuart Ashen on YouTube

1987 video games
Side-scrolling beat 'em ups
Single-player video games
Telecomsoft games
Video games about ninja
Video games developed in Sweden
ZX Spectrum games
ZX Spectrum-only games